State Highway 142 (SH 142) is a  long state highway in southern Colorado. SH 142's western terminus is at U.S. Route 285 (US 285) near Romeo, and the eastern terminus is at SH 159 in San Luis.

Route description
SH 142 begins in the west at its junction with US 285 mere feet outside the city limits of Romeo. The route heads east through the towns of Manassa and San Acacio before reaching its eastern terminus at San Luis where it meets SH 159.

The highway passes through the San Luis Hills and over the Rio Grande. The Manassa Dike is visible from the highway as it passes through the hills. Overall, the highway has very little traffic, especially the section that passes through the San Luis Hills. SH 142 connects the two river valleys (Conejos, Culebra Creek), passing through a high desert with little vegetation.

Scenic Byway
All of the highway is part of the Los Caminos Antiguos Scenic Byway

Major intersections

References

External links

142
Transportation in Conejos County, Colorado
Transportation in Costilla County, Colorado